Spyridon Giannaros (born 12 May 1992) is a Greek competitive rower who lives in Athens. He is a two-time World Champion in the men's lightweight quadruple sculls. In 2014 he made world best time in Lm4x with Panagiotis Magdanis and Konsolas brothers. He won the gold medal at the 2012 Word rowing under 23 Championship in Trakai Lithuania, Lightweight single sculls. He competed at the 2016 Summer Olympics in Rio de Janeiro, in the men's lightweight coxless four, finishing in the sixth place.
In 2021 he graduated as a physiotherapist from the University of West Attica.

References

1992 births
Living people
Greek male rowers
Olympic rowers of Greece
Rowers at the 2016 Summer Olympics
World Rowing Championships medalists for Greece
Rowers from Athens
Mediterranean Games gold medalists for Greece
Mediterranean Games medalists in rowing
Competitors at the 2018 Mediterranean Games